Maunabudhuk–Bodhe Sign Language is a village sign language of the neighboring villages of Maunabudhuk and Bodhe in far eastern Nepal.

See also
Jumla Sign Language
Jhankot Sign Language
Ghandruk Sign Language

References

Village sign languages
Sign languages of Nepal
Languages of Koshi Province